Brzuze  is a village in Rypin County, Kuyavian-Pomeranian Voivodeship, in north-central Poland. It is the seat of the gmina (administrative district) called Gmina Brzuze.

References

Brzuze